Bed of Roses is a 1996 American romance drama film written and directed by Michael Goldenberg and starring Christian Slater and Mary Stuart Masterson.

Plot
Lisa Walker (Mary Stuart Masterson) is a business executive who has gotten used to being alone but doesn't like it very much. She was abandoned by her birth parents and then spent most of her childhood being raised by Stanley (S.A. Griffin), a foster father who never really loved Lisa after her adopted mother died.

One day, Lisa gets word that Stanley has died. Alone in her apartment, after attempting to feed her now dead pet fish, she breaks down and cries uncontrollably. The next day at work, Lisa gets an unexpected delivery of flowers from a secret admirer. Puzzled, she presses the delivery man for information on who might have sent her the flowers. He says the sender wants to remain anonymous. Lisa asks her friends for names and visits the flower shop to no avail.

After getting to know each other better, the florist confesses that he sent them. Lewis (Christian Slater) runs a flower shop and often takes long walks through the neighborhood at night, trying to lose memories of his deceased wife and child. He saw Lisa crying in her window and hoped the roses would cheer her up. Before long, Lisa and Lewis begin dating but each has emotional issues to resolve before their story can have a happy ending.

Cast
 Christian Slater as Lewis Farrell
 Mary Stuart Masterson as Lisa Walker
 Pamela Adlon as Kim (Credited as Pamela Segall)
 Josh Brolin as Danny
 Debra Monk as Mrs. Farrell
 Mary Alice as Alice
 Desiree Casado as Amelia
 Kenneth Cranham as Simon
 Ally Walker as Wendy
 S.A. Griffin as Stanley

Reception
Rotten Tomatoes gives the film a 19% rating based on reviews from 16 critics.

Roger Ebert gave it 2 stars out of 4, calling the main characters "sad sacks." Conversely, his on-screen parter Gene Siskel conceded that the film, while a bit odd, contained some touching moments. He awarded the film three stars.

Jack Mathews of the Los Angeles Times was critical of the too predictable plot but praised the performances.

Soundtrack
Reference:

References

External links
 
 
 
 
 

1996 films
1996 directorial debut films
1996 romantic drama films
American romantic drama films
Films scored by Michael Convertino
Films set in Manhattan
Films shot in New York City
Films with screenplays by Michael Goldenberg
New Line Cinema films
1990s English-language films
1990s American films